Zonnar (also Romanized as Zonār) is a village in Talang Rural District, Talang District, Qasr-e Qand County, Sistan and Baluchestan Province, Iran. At the 2006 census, its population was 113, in 23 families.

References 

Populated places in Qasr-e Qand County